Neosybra hachijoensis is a species of beetle in the family Cerambycidae. It was described by Hayashi in 1961.

References

Neosybra
Beetles described in 1961